Statistics of L. League in the 2004 season. Saitama Reinas FC won the championship.

Division 1

Result

League awards

Best player

Top scorers

Best eleven

Best young player

Division 2

Result 

 Best Player: Aya Miyama, Okayama Yunogo Belle

See also 
 Empress's Cup

External links 
  Nadeshiko League Official Site

Nadeshiko League seasons
1
L
Japan
Japan